The 1962 Szczecin military parade of October 9, 1962, led to a road traffic accident in which a tank of the Polish People's Army crushed bystanders, killing seven children and injuring many more. The resultant panic in the crowd led to further injuries in the rush to escape. The incident was covered up for many years by the Polish communist authorities.

Background of the parade
The Autumn of 1962 was a hectic time, as due to the growing Cuban Missile Crisis, the world was standing on the brink of war between the Eastern Bloc and the Western Bloc. In such circumstances, Polish authorities under Soviet pressure decided to organize huge military exercises, located in northwest Poland, in the area of Szczecin. The exercises were observed by Marshal of the Soviet Union Andrei Grechko as well as several Polish officials, including Władysław Gomułka and Marian Spychalski. The parade in Szczecin was to be the finale of the maneuvers.

The parade
On October 9, 1962, the main streets in the center of Szczecin were closed to traffic. Inhabitants of the city crowded the sidewalks, curious to see tanks and equipment of the three allied armies: the Polish People's Army, the Soviet Army, and the National People's Army (NVA). Tens of thousands of people, including children, gathered along Szczecin’s main arteries of Aleja Wojska Polskiego, Aleja Piastów and Aleja Kościuszki. Everybody was anticipating the widely promoted event, and schoolchildren were told to describe the parade as their homework. Students of all schools were allowed to go home early, so that they could see the parade. In most cases curious children were standing on the curbs as close to the tanks and other weapons as possible.

City authorities adorned streets with flags of Poland, Soviet Union and East Germany; in schools flowers had been given to children, who were then ordered to wave them at soldiers. Newspapers headlines told readers that they would witness "A parade of our might", "A symbol of brotherhood in arms that serves the peace" and that "Polish Szczecin welcomes allied forces".

The parade was seen by the Warsaw Pact planners as a show of strength of its forces. It had been very carefully prepared, and Marshal Grechko wanted to present some of the best and most advanced weapons possessed by the Pact in 1962. Thus, spectators had a chance to see cannons, mortars, armored personnel carriers, howitzers and tanks. Above the city a few heavy Mi-6 helicopters flew and warships of the Soviet Navy lay moored in the port.

First, tanks and weapons of the NVA appeared, followed by Soviet tanks, and finally Polish units. Crowds of people, adults and children alike, came closer and closer to the vehicles, not listening to the militsiya, who were telling them to move back.

The tragedy

It is not known why a T-54 tank (marked with number 0165) of the Polish Army ran into a group of children, standing either on the sidewalk by the Aleja Piastow street, or on the street itself (sources vary on this matter). All documents describing this incident were destroyed in March 1982 and all information about the tragedy was blanked out. It is possible that the tank, which was the last one in line, drove too fast or skidded on the slippery road. The tank, weighing 36 tons, was traveling at a speed of some 30 km/h.

Altogether, seven children died. Four of them were students of Szczecin’s Elementary number 1; in 2006 a tablet commemorating the tragedy was placed by the entrance to the school. The children who died were aged from 6 to 12 years. Also an additional 21 persons, including several more children, were injured, some of them permanently. After the incident, panic broke out in the crowd, as a result of which 22 persons were injured.

Aftermath
The shocked inhabitants of Szczecin never had a chance to find out more about the incident. The communist authorities expunged any information about the event and it was not reported in the Polish mass media.  A local daily Glos Szczecinski placed a small notice on October 10 telling readers that seven children died during a parade. Families of the dead children were told to not discuss the topic with anyone.

Hundreds of witnesses were later called by the military prosecutor’s office. All were told that the incident was classified and revealing it would mean imprisonment.  At the same time, the trial of the tank’s crew was dismissed, as, according to the military court, the tank had not crossed the curb. All hospital documents connected with the event were confiscated by the military, never to be returned. However, it was impossible to completely suppress news of this event, as too many people had witnessed it. By mid-October 1962 wild rumors were rife in Szczecin: people telling each other that 30, or even more people died, and 100 were wounded.

To this day, the events surrounding the 1962 Szczecin parade are largely unknown elsewhere in Poland.

Sources
 Polska.pl
 East News
 Gazeta.pl

Szczecin Military Parade, 1962
Szczecin Military Parade, 1962
Szczecin Military Parade, 1962
Military parades in Poland
Warsaw Pact
Poland–Soviet Union relations
Military history of Poland
History of Szczecin
Parades in Poland
October 1962 events in Europe